The Global Facility for Disaster Reduction and Recovery (GFDRR) is a global partnership program established on September 29, 2006 to support developing countries on disaster risk reduction and climate change adaptation. The facility is administered by the World Bank and governed by a Consultative Group including the World Bank Group, the United Nations Office for Disaster Risk Reduction (UNDRR) and several other international organizations and countries.

GFDRR was initially launched to support the implementation of the Hyogo Framework for Action 2005-2015 (HFA) approved during the Second World Conference on Disaster Reduction in 2005. On March 18, 2015, the Sendai Framework for Disaster Risk Reduction 2015-2030 (Sendai Framework) was adopted. GFDRR now supports the implementation of this framework.

Programs and activities

GFDRR is a grant-funding mechanism allocating financing and providing technical assistance through thematic and country specific programs with a focus on disaster risk financial protection, resilient infrastructures, cities, hydromet services and access to disaster risk information. GFDRR is also the author of several publications discussing policy measures to mitigate disaster and climate risk.

See also
 Disaster Risk Reduction
 Climate change adaptation
 Emergency Management
 Natural Disasters
 Vulnerability
 Business continuity planning
 Climate Change
 Risk Management

References

Disaster management
World Bank Group